Dead Hands Dig Deep is a 2016 documentary film and the directorial debut of Jai Love. The film follows a now thirty-eight-year-old Edwin Borsheim, vocalist of the band Kettle Cadaver as he reflects on his dark past.

Plot

Thirty-eight-year-old Edwin Borsheim of the band Kettle Cadaver was once known for his bizarre stage antics and brutal self-mutilation. Now, years after the band's demise, Borsheim has fallen into complete seclusion on his acre of land in which he is surrounded by many of the horrible things he has created. As Edwin spirals further into a hole of drug abuse and self-destruction, those closest to Borsheim dissect his mental complexes as he himself reflects on his dark past. Although Borsheim finds himself trapped in his own home, he just may be saved by human interaction.

Development
The film was shot in Temecula, California and produced by Lonesome Pictures. Prior to the production of the film, there was an extensive search for Edwin. Although his residence had been confirmed, there were different variables that stood in the way of actual contact. At the time, Borsheim had no phone or email and his property was guarded by his watch-dogs which made it virtually impossible to come in contact with him. After resigning the idea of making the film, Borsheim's relatives activated a phone for him and put the filmmakers in contact. The film began production months after they started their search.

On the first day of principle shooting, Edwin began directing violent threats at the film crew. Borsheim made it clear, that until the production of the film, nobody had entered his house in over a year. He'd been completely alone there. When first in talks with Borsheim over the phone, the filmmakers began receiving pictures from Borsheim portraying a variety of disturbing imagery. As production continued, other members of the crew began to receive similar pictures. Due to the hostility that both Edwin and his brother Danny held for their mother, both refused to see her for the film. After much pleading from the producers, Danny escorted the crew to see his mother to interview her for the documentary. Multiple times during post-production, Edwin went off the grid. His phone was de-activated many times and he was on and off of his property. Borsheim's property was meant to be seized due to not paying property tax, and began making it clear that he planned to kill anyone who tried to take his property away and commit suicide once he came back into contact with the producers. Eventually, his family intervened and paid his property tax.

When the film was completed Edwin revealed to the crew that he had planned to murder them all, but he couldn’t bring himself to do it. He called this attempt at infamy ‘Kettle Cadaver 3’ and ended up welding his gun cabinet shut as a result of the failed execution.

Edwin called making the film therapeutic and often stayed in contact with the crew post-production. Edwin attended a special screening of the film at the ArcLight cinema in Hollywood. Edwin died by suicide on June 20, 2017.

Reception

The film has received positive reviews from The Hollywood Reporter calling it 'a haunting study of depravity', Indiewire, and Roger Ebert. The film has also screened at several film festivals including Slamdance Film Festival,  Fantasia International Film Festival, Lausanne Underground Film and Music Festival, Sidewalk Moving Picture Festival and Sydney Underground FIlm Festival.

Release
The documentary premiered at the 2016 Slamdance Film Festival in Park City, Utah and was purchased by Slamdance Studios, who sold onto Hulu as well as Monster Pictures who handled a special edition DVD. The film was released theatrically and on VOD in November, 2017.

References

External links
 

Documentary films about heavy metal music and musicians
2016 films
2010s English-language films